The Sundog Two-Seater is a Canadian powered parachute that was designed and produced by Sundog Powerchutes of Sparwood, British Columbia and later Pierceland, Saskatchewan. Now out of production, when it was available the aircraft was supplied as a complete ready-to-fly-aircraft.

The aircraft was introduced in 2002 and production ended when the company went out of business in 2014.

Design and development
It features a  Apco 500 parachute-style wing, two-seats-in-side-by-side configuration, tricycle landing gear and a single  Rotax 582 two-stroke engine in pusher configuration. The  HKS 700E four-stroke engine was a factory option.

The aircraft carriage is built from bolted 6061-T6 aluminium, stainless steel fittings and aircraft bolts. In flight steering is accomplished via foot pedals that actuate the canopy brakes, creating roll and yaw. On the ground the aircraft has lever-controlled nosewheel steering. The main landing gear incorporates spring rod suspension. The occupants are protected by a series of circular aluminium tubes in the event of a roll-over.

The company also supplied custom trailers for towing the aircraft behind an automobile.

Operational history
In  September 2015 three examples were registered with Transport Canada and three were registered in the United States with the Federal Aviation Administration.

Reviewing the aircraft in 2003 Jean-Pierre le Camus said, "this side by side Canadian machine has a lot of character".

Specifications (Two-Seater)

References

External links
Company website archives on Archive.org

Two-Seater
2000s Canadian sport aircraft
2000s Canadian ultralight aircraft
Single-engined pusher aircraft
Powered parachutes